This is a list of cities in Peru by population.  For metropolitan areas see List of metropolitan areas of Peru.

List

See also
List of metropolitan areas of Peru
List of regions by population of Peru

References

External links

 

Cities, largest
Peru
Peru, List of cities in
Peru